In the 2017 Fredericia municipal election, the Social Democrats won comfortably with 54.3% of the vote, and 13 of the 21 seats (61.9%). However, Jacob Bjerregaard, who became mayor following the result in 2017, stepped down as mayor in December 2020. Tabloid newspaper Ekstra Bladet, speculated that some of the scandals that had occurred throughout his mayor period, may have been a factor in this decision. Due to the dramatic period, it was speculated that the Social Democrats might lose the mayor position following this election.

On election night it became clear that the Social Democrats had lost a lot of support. They decreased their vote share by 17%, and lost their absolute majority in the council. However, due the Red–Green Alliance keeping their one-seat, and the Green Left gaining a seat, a slim majority of 11 red bloc seats were won. As a result of this, Steen Wrist from the Social Democrats, who had taken over from Jacob Bjerregaard in 2020, would eventually end up continuing as mayor.

Electoral system
For elections to Danish municipalities, a number varying from 9 to 31 are chosen to be elected to the municipal council. The seats are then allocated using the D'Hondt method and a closed list proportional representation.
Fredericia Municipality had 21 seats in 2021

Unlike in Danish General Elections, in elections to municipal councils, electoral alliances are allowed.

Electoral alliances  

Electoral Alliance 1

Electoral Alliance 2

Electoral Alliance 3

Results

Notes

References 

Fredericia